Nicola Maldacea (29 October 1870 – 5 March 1945) was an Italian actor, comedian and singer. He appeared in more than sixty films from 1935 to 1956.

Selected filmography

References

External links 
 

1870 births
1945 deaths
Italian male film actors